Moanda or Muanda is a town and territory lying on the Atlantic Ocean coast of the Democratic Republic of the Congo at the mouth of the Congo River. It is situated in Kongo Central Province, and has a population of 90,812 as of 2012. The town has an airport and is known for its beaches, and has a few limited tourist facilities, but tourism is incidental to the main economic activities of the town.

The Moanda Oil Terminal, consisting of various platforms, pipelines and a permanent tanker, lies 10 miles southwest of Point Kipundji. Some 100 km upstream from Muanda, on the north bank of the Congo River, lies the city of Boma, DR Congo's second-largest port. The great width and depth of the Congo River allow seagoing vessels to reach Boma and the largest port, Matadi, despite their distance from the coast.

Climate
The Köppen-Geiger climate classification system classifies Moanda‘s climate as tropical wet and dry (Aw), although it is only marginally wet enough to avoid being classed as a hot semi-arid climate (BSh).

See also
 Mangroves National Park

References

External links
 Description of Muanda (French) (English Translation)

Populated places in Kongo Central
Communities on the Congo River